G Is for Deep is a solo studio album by American hip hop artist Doseone. It was released on Anticon on May 29, 2012.

Critical reception

At Metacritic, which assigns a weighted average score out of 100 to reviews from mainstream critics, G Is for Deep received an average score of 66, based on 7 reviews, indicating "generally favorable reviews".

Bram E. Gieben of The Skinny gave the album 4 stars out of 5, stating, "the beats, which Dose produced, are heavily electro-influenced, with a melodic pop sheen that suits his approach to vocals on this release." He added: "There's little straight-up rap on the album, but Dose's layered, breathy falsetto singing is definitely a product of incredible breath control and strict rhythmic pattern-generation." Ben Cardew of NME gave the album 2.5 stars out of 5, calling it "an alien funk, in which scampering beats collide with wistful vocal lines." Zach Long of Alarm said, "Doseone returns with a record that reaches in new directions while retaining all the unique characteristics that make his music unmistakable."

Azeen Ghorayshi of East Bay Express included it on the "Top Ten Albums of 2012" list.

Track listing

Personnel
Credits adapted from liner notes.

 Doseone – vocals, production
 Mike Cresswell – mixing, mastering
 Thomas Brendan – design

References

External links
 

2012 albums
Doseone albums
Anticon albums